Secutor is a genus of ponyfishes native to the Indian Ocean and the western Pacific Ocean.

Genus name
Secutor was coined by Gistel in 1848 with Forsskål’s Scombrops equula as its type species, this being a synonym for Leiognathus equulus. In 1904 Fowler created the genus Deveximentum with Bloch’s Zeus insidiator as its type species. Fishbase still uses Secutor as the name but Catalog of Fishes states that as the type species for Secutor is synonymous with L. equulus then Secutor is a synonym of Leiognathus and prefers Fowler’s Deveximentum.

Species
There are currently seven recognized species in this genus:
 Secutor hanedai Mochizuki & Hayashi, 1989
 Secutor indicius Monkolprasit, 1973
 Secutor insidiator (Bloch, 1787) (Pugnose ponyfish)
 Secutor interruptus (Valenciennes, 1835) (Pig-nosed ponyfish)
 Secutor mazavasaoka Z. H. Baldwin & Sparks, 2011
 Secutor megalolepis Mochizuki & Hayashi, 1989 (Bigscale ponyfish)
 Secutor ruconius (F. Hamilton, 1822) (Deep pugnose ponyfish)

References

 
Leiognathidae
Bioluminescent fish
Taxa named by Johannes von Nepomuk Franz Xaver Gistel
Marine fish genera